Pat Walsh may refer to:
 Pat Walsh (author), American publishing consultant
 Pat Walsh (hurler) (born 1963), Irish hurler
 Pat Walsh (rugby) (1879–1953), Australian dual-code rugby footballer
 Pat Walsh (rugby union) (1936–2007), New Zealand rugby union footballer
 Pat Walsh (social entrepreneur) (born 1979), American social entrepreneur

See also
Patrick Walsh (disambiguation)